Kim Ji-hyun (born June 16, 1988), professionally known as G.Soul, is a South Korean singer-songwriter. He first made his debut under JYP Entertainment with the release of his EP Coming Home on January 19, 2015. On June 6, 2017, it was revealed that he left JYP and would be joining H1ghr Music.

On December 2, 2019, it was announced by H1GHR Music that G.Soul would change his name to Golden, named after a song by Jill Scott. On January 11, 2021, he announced via Instagram Stories that he would be changing his name back to G.Soul.

Early life and education 
In 2001, G.Soul met JYP through an audition show on SBS called 'Prodigy Growth 99%(영재육성 프로젝트 99%)'.
Before debuting as a solo artist in South Korea, G.Soul received recognition in the country and some parts of America for being a "protege". He was trained for 15 years before making his debut, making him the longest trainee under JYP.

Discography

Extended plays

Singles

Soundtrack appearances

Other charted songs

References

1988 births
Living people
American contemporary R&B singers
American male pop singers
American musicians of Korean descent
JYP Entertainment artists
21st-century American singers
21st-century American male singers